The Institute of Business Administration and Management (IBAM) was a collaboration between the Institute of Chartered Secretaries and Administrators (ICSA) and the Institute of Business Administration (IBA).

IBAM is an operating division of the ICSA group with a qualifying scheme designed specifically to provide knowledge and qualifications for people involved in business. It has a logical qualification structure that incorporates Certificates, a Diploma and an Advance Diploma covering all aspects of business administration and management.

Qualifying grades 
Candidates registered on an IBAM course qualifies for IBAM membership on completion. The qualifying grades are:

Licentiate (LInst.BA) – Successful completion of:
 IBAM Diploma programme
GNVQ in Business Studies
National Diploma in Business Studies
Associate (A.Inst.BA) – Successful completion of:
IBAM Diploma in Business Administration
HNC/D in Business Studies
ICSA Foundation programme

Professional Grades 
Member (M.Inst.BA) - Successful completion of IBAM Advanced Diploma, it also may be granted to those who have completed:
 BA(Hons) in Business Studies
 MBA
 ICSA Pre-Professional Programme
Fellow (F.Inst.BA) - Successful completion of IBAM Advanced Diploma it also may be granted to those who have completed:
 BA in Business Studies
MBA
ICSA members who have + 3 years relevant managerial experience.

IBAM modules 
Business Accounting
Business Communications
Business Finance
Business Law
Business Operations Administration
Business Planning and Strategies
Human Resource Administration
Internet and Information Administration
Premises/Facilities Administration
Management in the organisation
Managing Change
Marketing Management
Total Quality Management

See also 
Institute of Chartered Secretaries and Administrators

References

External links  

ICSA Official Site

Business Administration and Management